Baneshwarpur is a census town within the jurisdiction of the Falta police station in the Falta CD block in the Diamond Harbour subdivision of the South 24 Parganas district in the Indian state of West Bengal.

Geography

Area overview
Diamond Harbour subdivision is a rural subdivision with patches of urbanization. Only 14.61% of the population lives in the urban areas and an overwhelming 85.39% lives in the rural areas. In the western portion of the subdivision (shown in the map alongside) there are 11 census towns. The entire district is situated in the Ganges Delta and the western part, located on the east bank of the Hooghly River, is covered by the Kulpi Diamond Harbour Plain, which is 5–6 metres above sea level. Archaeological excavations at Deulpota and Harinarayanpur, on the bank of the Hooghly River indicate the existence of human habitation more than 2,000 years ago.

Note: The map alongside presents some of the notable locations in the subdivision. All places marked in the map are linked in the larger full screen map.

Location
Baneshwarpur is located at 

Hasimnagar, Baneshwarpur of the Falta CD block and Ajodhyanagar, Sirakol of the Magrahat I CD block form a cluster of census towns.

Demographics
According to the 2011 Census of India, Baneshwarpur had a total population of 4,741 of which 2,423 (51%) were males and 2,318 (49%) were females. There were  538 persons in the age range of 0–6 years. The total number of literate persons in Baneshwarpur was 3,507 (83.44% of the population over 6 years).

Infrastructure
According to the District Census Handbook 2011, Baneshwarpur covered an area of 2.0718 km2. Among the civic amenities, the protected water supply involved tap water  from treated sources and hand pumps. It had 430 domestic electric connections. Among the medical facilities it had a dispensary/ health centre 4 km away. Among the educational facilities it had were 2 primary schools, 1 middle school, 1 secondary schools, 1 senior secondary school, the nearest general degree college at Sirakol 0.5 km away.

Transport
Baneshwarpur is on the Sirakol-Usthi Road.

Healthcare
Falta Block Primary Health Centre, with 10 beds, at Falta, is the major government medical facility in the Falta CD block.

References

Cities and towns in South 24 Parganas district